Vale Leonard Broom (November 8, 1911–November 19, 2009) also known as Leonard Bloom, was an American sociologist whose career spanned seven decades. He was known for his research on discrimination and social inequality, which began with his studies on the effects of Japanese internment.

Biography
Leonard Broom was born on November 8, 1911 in Boston, Massachusetts.

Broom was educated at Boston University (B.S. Phi Beta Kappa, 1933; A.M., 1934) and Duke University (Ph.D., 1937). 

In 1941, he obtained a tenure-track appointment at the University of California-Los Angeles (UCLA), making him the second person to be named to the faculty of the department of sociology and anthropology there. From 1955 to 1957, he was the editor-in-chief of the American Sociological Review. In 1959, he left the faculty of UCLA to become a professor at the University of Texas-Austin (UT-Austin), where he helped establish the Population Research Center. He was the Ashbel Smith Professor of Sociology at UT-Austin from 1959 to 1971, and chair of the sociology department there from 1959 to 1966. In 1971, he became a professor of sociology at the Institute of Advanced Studies at The Australian National University, where he continued to teach until 1976. He was a research associate at the University of California-Santa Barbara from 1980 until his death.

He died on November 19, 2009 in Santa Barbara, California.

Honors, awards, and recognition
Broom received a Fulbright Fellowship in 1950 to conduct research in Jamaica, and a Guggenheim Fellowship in 1958 for research in Australia. While on the faculty of UT-Austin, he received a one-year fellowship in the Center for Advanced Study in the Behavioral Sciences (1962-3). He was a fellow of the Academy of Social Sciences in Australia and the Royal Anthropological Institute, and received an honorary degree (DSc) from Boston University. In 2002, the Research School of Population Health at the Australian National University established the Leonard Broom endowment in his honor; it serves to give indigenous Australians the opportunity to pursue health-related careers. In 2011, the Leonard and Gretchan Broom Center for Demography was established at the University of California, Santa Barbara, with generous funding from Broom and his wife, Gretchan.

Publications

References

1911 births
2009 deaths
American sociologists
University of California, Los Angeles faculty
University of Texas at Austin faculty
Academic staff of the Australian National University
Boston University alumni
Duke University alumni
University of California, Santa Barbara faculty
People from Boston
Academic journal editors
Center for Advanced Study in the Behavioral Sciences fellows
Fellows of the Academy of the Social Sciences in Australia
Fellows of the Royal Anthropological Institute of Great Britain and Ireland
American Sociological Review editors